Charummoodu is a major junction and town in Mavelikkara taluk of the Alappuzha district, of Kerala state in India. The Vetticode Nagaraja Temple is located 4 kilometers from the town. Padanilam Parabrahma Temple, which is famous for its Sivarathri festival, is about 5 kilometers away.

The junction between Kayamkulam - Punalur Road and Kollam - Theni National Highway 183 is at Charummoodu.

Locations
It is located 12 km from Kayamkulam town. It is a main junction on the intersection of SH-5 (KP Road Kayamkulam - Punalur road) and National Highway 183 (India), connecting Kollam and Theni. Charummoodu is located at the border of the Thamarakkulam, Nooranad and Chunakkara Panchayaths and the second largest town in the Mavelikkara Taluk. There is a proposal to form Charummoodu Panchayath by joining parts of Chunakkara, Nooranad and Thamarakkulam panchayaths.

Notable residents 

 O. Madhavan – playwright, director, social activist, drama, doctor.
 B. Aburaj – poet, educationalist, and journalist. Director State Institute of Educational Technology (SIET, Kerala) and director of the State Institute of Educational Management and Training (SIEMAT, Kerala) General Education Department, Government of Kerala. Asst private secretary to Minister for Home and Tourism from 2006 to 2011. Sub editor in Deshabhimani Daily and Editor of The Commercial, Business Magazine from Muscat.

References

1.http://www.sietkerala.gov.in/
2.http://www.sietkerala.gov.in/news-aburaj-director-siet-releases-gothramozhi-digital-contents-for-school-students-in-four-tribal-languages-at-diet-sulthan-bathery-wayanad-on-21st-jan-20201
3.in Alappuzha district

Kerala